Rayet is a small lunar impact crater that lies on the far side of the Moon, past the northeast limb. It lies to the southwest of the larger crater Millikan, and east of the comparably sized Petrie.

This crater is roughly circular in shape, with a sharp edge and relatively featureless inner walls that slope downward to the nearly level interior floor. The diameter of the floor is roughly two-thirds that of the crater. This formation has not been notably worn by impact erosion, and is otherwise undistinguished.

This feature is named after the French astronomer Georges Rayet (1839–1906).

Satellite craters
By convention these features are identified on lunar maps by placing the letter on the side of the crater midpoint that is closest to Rayet.

References

 
 
 
 
 
 
 
 
 
 
 
 

Impact craters on the Moon